Brahmapurisvarar Temple, Thiruppattur is a Siva temple in Thiruppattur in Trichy district in Tamil Nadu (India).

Vaippu Sthalam
It is one of the shrines of the Vaippu Sthalams sung by Tamil Saivite Nayanar Appar and Sundarar. This place was known as Pidavur.

Presiding deity
The presiding deity is Brahmapurisvarar. The Goddess is known as Brahmanayaki.

Speciality
Though this is a Siva Temple, it is famous for the Brahma shrine found in the temple.

References

Hindu temples in Tiruchirappalli district
Shiva temples in Tiruchirappalli district